First-seeded Roy Emerson defeated Fred Stolle 6–4, 6–1, 6–4 in the final to win the men's singles tennis title at the 1964 U.S. National Championships.

Seeds
The seeded players are listed below. Roy Emerson is the champion; others show the round in which they were eliminated.

 Roy Emerson (champion)
 Dennis Ralston (quarterfinals)
 Rafael Osuna (semifinals)
 Chuck McKinley (semifinals)
 Fred Stolle (finalist)
 Manuel Santana (second round)
 Nicola Pietrangeli (second round)
 Arthur Ashe (fourth round)

Draw

Key
 Q = Qualifier
 WC = Wild card
 LL = Lucky loser
 r = Retired

Finals

Earlier rounds

Section 1

Section 2

Section 3

Section 4

Section 5

Section 6

Section 7

Section 8

References

External links
 1964 U.S. National Championships on ITFtennis.com, the source for this draw
 Association of Tennis Professionals (ATP) – 1964 U.S. Championships Men's Singles draw

U.S. National Championships (tennis) by year – Men's singles
Mens Singles